Carnage is a 2017 mockumentary directed by Simon Amstell.  Set in the year 2067, when veganism is the norm, the film looks back on meat-eating today. It premiered on BBC iPlayer.

Synopsis 
Set in 2067, the narrator tells how the world is a happier place, as meat eating ("carnism") is banned and veganism prevails. Young people express their disbelief on how people could have ever killed and eaten animals. Yasmine Vondenburgen, a psychotherapist, holds support sessions for former carnists to lift the guilt of carnism. In one session, Davina breaks down after naming Edam as a cheese she once ate.

The film goes back to 1944, to the establishment of The Vegan Society, and rationing of meat due to war, which ends in 1954. Fanny Cradock promotes carnism in theatre and TV. In the 1970s and 1980s, US food companies disguise meat as toys children would like to eat, using figures like Ronald McDonald to attract them. Intensive farming leads to BSE crisis and foot-and-mouth disease. From 2004, many diseases grow due to consumption of processed meats.

The film then returns to 2067, with young people using new VR technology to experience eating meat. They stop after a while, unable to process it.

Going back to 2017, the film shows how celebrity chefs like Nigella Lawson, Gordon Ramsay, Jamie Oliver and Hugh Fearnley-Whittingstall promote carnism instead of veganism. It shows the rise in veganism, helped by people like JME, who inspires Troye King Jones. King Jones then writes a book and makes feature films on veganism. Maude Polikoff, former erotic dancer, reveals she left the career as milk and dairy were used in a sexualised way, in spite of being unethically obtained. Vondenburgen explains how the hierarchy of the British monarchy led to humans believing they should be above animals. The UN urges people to cut down on meat, due to climate change. This is ignored, and the UK faces floods. Lindsay Graber, a victim of these, explains climate change due to meat on TV. Veganism is promoted by TV presenters, but it is ignored, and in 2021 the UK faces a Super Swine Flu, killing many. Intensive farming is banned to prevent a re-occurrence, but this hikes up costs of meat, and many people are confused over what to eat.

In 2023, this Era of Confusion is broken by a new celebrity chef Freddy Jayashankar, who re-introduces a plant based Eastern cuisine. It is revealed that King Jones and Jayashankar are in a relationship. Later, a film, Dorothy is Still Dorothy, is broadcast by the BBC featuring Dorothy, a woman with Alzheimer's who forgets that eating a chicken is normal, much to the annoyance of her son Jeff. In 2024, a musical featuring Amelie dressed as a cow is made, which exposes the horrors of the dairy industry. Albania wins the Eurovision Song Contest by a vegan song.

Meanwhile, Graham Watkins speaks out against veganism, harassing vegans on streets and in restaurants. A TV show, Mike's Meat House, mocking veganism is started, but cancelled after four episodes. Graber returns to TV to explain harsh environmental effects of beef, and suggesting a ban on it, which is not accepted by the British, leading to riots. King Jones appears for an interview on Newsnight. Shortly after that, he is murdered and cannibalised, allegedly by a member of the Great British Meat League. This sparks a revolution, with major food companies including McDonald's and KFC turning vegan, and 75% of UK at least vegetarian; yet there is a reluctance for criminalising carnism. Watkins, with other carnists, states illogical reasons defending carnism.

All such arguments are resolved by the invention of a Thought Translator, allowing animals to communicate freely with humans using the recorded voice of Joanna Lumley. The unethical practices of the egg industry are explained. In 2035, the Bill of Animal Rights is finally passed, criminalising carnism. The animals who were victims of the industry are sent to recovery centres. Coming back to 2067, the Clifton Abattoir is now a museum to explain the horrific dairy industry of the past. The young and old apologise to each other.

The film ends with the support group successfully naming the fish they had once eaten.

Cast 
 Simon Amstell as Narrator
 Linda Bassett as Yasmine Vondenburgen
 Gemma Jones as Davina
 JME as Himself
 John Macmillan as Troye King Jones
 Lindsay Duncan as Maude Polikoff
 Claire Keelan as Lindsay Graber
 Lorraine Kelly as Herself
 Mawaan Rizwan as Freddy Jayashankar
 Eileen Atkins as Dorothy
 Martin Freeman as Jeff
 Samantha Spiro as Amelie/Edith Paper, actress in dairy musical
 James Smith as Graham Watkins
 Alex Lawther as Joseph, a teenager
 Joanna Lumley (voice) as Herself
 Kirsty Wark as Herself
 Vanessa Feltz as Herself
 Christian Fraser as Himself
 Clive Myrie as Himself

See also
 List of vegan media

References

External links
 
 

2010s mockumentary films
British comedy films
Films set in 1944
Films set in 2017
Films set in 2021
Films set in 2023
Films set in 2024
Films set in 2035
Films set in 2067
Veganism
2010s English-language films
2010s British films